Philipp Treu (born 3 December 2000) is a German professional footballer who plays as a right-back for SC Freiburg II.

Career statistics

References

2000 births
Living people
German footballers
Association football defenders
3. Liga players
Regionalliga players
1. FC Kaiserslautern players
RB Leipzig players
SC Freiburg players
SC Freiburg II players
Sportspeople from Heidelberg
Footballers from Baden-Württemberg